The Mediterranean thin-toed gecko (Mediodactylus danilewskii) is a species of lizard in the family Gekkonidae. It is found in Bulgaria, Ukraine, Turkey, and Greece. It is sometimes considered a subspecies of Kotschy's gecko.

References

Mediodactylus
Reptiles described in 1887